Saint Hunfrid of Prüm (died 871), commonly Saint Humphrey in English, was a Benedictine monk at the Abbey of Prüm who was reluctantly promoted to become Bishop of Thérouanne by Pope Nicholas I.

His feast day is 8 March.

External links
Hunfrid at Catholic Online
Saint of the Day, March 8: Humphrey of Pruem  at SaintPatrickDC.org

Year of birth missing
871 deaths
Frankish Benedictines
Bishops in the Carolingian Empire
Bishops of Thérouanne
Saints from the Carolingian Empire